Fuscoporia torulosa is a species of bracket fungus in the genus Fuscoporia, family Hymenochaetaceae. A wood-decay fungus, it causes a white rot of heartwood in dead and living hardwood trees in Europe, and in coniferous trees in North America.

Taxonomy
Until recently, this species was known as Phellinus torulosus. However, a phylogenetic study in 2001 resulted in the genus Phellinus being split into five new genera, and P. torulosus being renamed to Fuscoporia torulosa.

Description

The fruiting body margin is rounded, and sometimes wavy, felt-like or tomentose on the flattened upper surface, which is typically orange-brown to rusty-brown in color. The color of the lower pore-bearing surface is cinnamon-, rust-, or olivaceous-brown, and there are 5 to 6 pores per millimeter.

Microscopic features 
Basidiospores are ovoid or ellipsoid, hyaline, smooth, with dimensions of 4–6 × 3–4 μm. The basidia are club-shaped, 4-spored, with dimensions of 14–16 × 5–6 μm.

Habitat and distribution 
Although its preferred host is Quercus, Fuscoporia torulosa has been reported growing on a variety of hardwood trees: Acer, Arbutus, Calluna, Castanea, Celtis, Ceratonia, Cercis, Cistus, Citrus, Cornus, Crataegus, Cydonia, Erica, Eucalyptus, Euonymus, Fagus, Fraxinus, Grevillea, Helianthemum, Juglans, Laurus, Malus, Melaleuca, Morus, Myrtus, Olea, Ostrya, Parrotia, Phillyrea, Pistacia, Pittosporum, Populus, Prunus, Punica, Pryus, Robinia, Rosa, Salix, Spartium, Ulex, Ulmus, Viburnum, Vitis, and, more rarely, conifers like Cedrus, Cupressus, Larix, Picea, and Pinus. Recently, F. torulosa has been reported as infecting more than 160 species of plants; most of these infections results in the plant's premature death.

Modern identification techniques 
Production of visible fruiting bodies by F. torulosa does not happen until long after the tree has been initially infected, as it takes some time for the fungal mycelia to colonize the host. For this reason it often escapes detection until it is too late to save the tree. In 2007, a rapid detection method was reported that uses DNA technology, specifically the polymerase chain reaction, to enable detection of fungal mycelia in infected tissues in roughly six hours.

References

External links 
Index Fungorum 

Fungal tree pathogens and diseases
Hymenochaetaceae
Fungi described in 1793